Takashi Matsuo may refer to:
 Takashi Matsuo (actor, born 1960), Japanese tarento and actor
 Takashi Matsuo (actor, born 1996), Japanese actor and vocalist